Derrick Deese Jr. (born August 19, 1998) is an American football tight end for the Detroit Lions of the National Football League (NFL). He played college football at San Jose State. He went undrafted in the 2022 NFL Draft and was subsequently picked up by the Lions.

Early life
Deese was born on August 19, 1998, in La Palma, California. He played high school football at John F. Kennedy High School. He was a two-star recruit. He recorded 431 receiving yards on 25 receptions as a senior.

College career

Golden West College
Deese's first collegiate touchdown came in the first week of the season against Glendale. He recorded a 36-yard touchdown reception, his only reception of the game in the 33–0 win. That would be Deese's only touchdown reception of the year as he finished with 155 receiving yards in six games.

As a sophomore in 2017, Deese recorded his first touchdown reception of the season against Cerritos. He recorded four receptions for 31 yards and one touchdown in the 23–36 loss. On September 30, he recorded his first 100-yard receiving game against Long Beach. He put up 111 yards on five receptions and one touchdown in the 24–52 loss.

Professional career
Deese went undrafted in the 2022 NFL Draft. He was picked up by the Detroit Lions on April 30. He was released by the Lions during their final offseason roster cutdown. He would remain a free agent until he was picked up by the Lions again on January 11, 2023. He signed a futures contract with the team.

Personal life
He is the son of Super Bowl XXIX champion offensive lineman Derrick Deese.

References

1998 births
Living people
People from La Palma, California
San Jose State Spartans football players
Detroit Lions players